St Joseph's Gaelic Football Club was a Gaelic football club in County Donegal, Ireland.

History
The club was formed in 1963 from the merger of Aodh Ruadh, based in Ballyshannon, and Réalt na Mara, based in Bundoran.

Brian McEniff explained in 2013 that St Joseph's was formed when the clubs in the two towns "were doing rather poorly. In spite of the great rivalry, they came together. The bonding factor was the De La Salle College in the upper part of our parish. The De La Salle Brothers ran a very good school. There were no more than 200 boys but they could play well above their lot. It was a great GAA school. All of the boys — except myself, I went to a boarding school in Monaghan — were from De La Salle. It was a natural transition".

St Joseph's won an unofficial Ulster Senior Club Football Championship against St John's in Irvinestown in 1966, reached the first official final in 1968 and won the official tournament in 1975; they remained the only Donegal club to do so until 2018 when Gaoth Dobhair won Ulster.

The clubs separated in 1977.

Notable players

 Séamus Grenadian
 Alan Kane
 Brian McEniff — county manager
 Danny McHugh
 Mickey McLoone
 Pauric McShea

Honours
 Ulster Senior Club Football Championship: 1975
 Donegal Senior Football Championship: 1965, 1968, 1970, 1971, 1973, 1974, 1975, 1976 
 Donegal Senior Football League: 4
 Gold Flake Cup: 1

References

Former Gaelic Athletic Association clubs in County Donegal
Gaelic football clubs in County Donegal